The American rock duo The Gutter Twins made a number of recordings starting in 2008.

Studio albums

Extended plays

Singles

Music videos

References

Discographies of American artists
Rock music group discographies